FIBA Awards are basketball awards that are given at the end of each FIBA tournament, or that are given in recognition of an individual's contributions to the sport. There are several awards that are attributed to the players, which have distinguished themselves from the rest, in different aspects of the game.

FIBA tournament awards
The FIBA tournament awards are awarded at the FIBA World Cup and the FIBA Women's World Cup, as well as at each of the FIBA continental cups, at both the senior and youth levels. 

The Most Valuable Player (the most valuable player within the tournament).
The All-Tournament Team (five players who distinguished themselves within the tournament, also commonly referred to as the All-Star Five).

Current award winners

World Cups

Most Valuable Player

All-Tournament Team

Continental Cups

Most Valuable Player

All-Tournament Team

Other FIBA individual awards

References

External links

Official website

awards
Basketball trophies and awards